Don Granger is an American film producer, best known for producing numerous Skydance Media films, including Jack Reacher and Mission: Impossible – Rogue Nation.

Career 
Granger started his career in 1987 by joining Weintraub Entertainment Group, later joined Touchstone Pictures in the next year. In 1990, he joined Paramount Pictures and worked as executive VP of production and overseeing till 2001.

In 2001, Granger joined Gary Levinsohn to work in the production company Mutual Film Company together, after its co-founder Mark Gordon left the company. He executive produced the film Timeline and produced Snakes on a Plane for the company.

In 2004, Granger joined Tom Cruise and Paula Wagner's Cruise/Wagner Productions as a senior exececutive of development and production, and he produced the film The Eye there.

In 2007, Granger joined the United Artists as a prexy of production.

In March 2014, Granger joined the Skydance Productions as the newly created post EVP Feature Productions, and he would report to Dana Goldberg, company's chief creative officer.

Personal life 
Granger married journalist and news anchor Lisa McRee in 1996.

Filmography

Film

References

External links 
 

Living people
Year of birth missing (living people)
American film producers
Skydance Media people